Patrick Smith (born 1972 in San Juan, Puerto Rico) is an installation artist, animator and filmmaker. He is a member of the Academy of Motion Picture Arts and Sciences (AMPAS). His formative years were spent as a storyboard artist for Walt Disney, and animation director for MTV's Daria and the Emmy-nominated Downtown. Smith spent five years in Singapore as a professor at the graduate film program for New York University Tisch School of the Arts, under artistic director/filmmaker Oliver Stone. Patrick is a fellow of the New York Foundation of the Arts and a curator for multiple international film and animation festivals.  He lives and works in Montauk New York with his wife, Kaori Ishida and their daughter. The beginning of his animation career has been told by himself like this:

In 1994, I was in college, and one night decided to animate something strange. I didn't know how to draw, let alone animate, so I just did something abstract. A friend of mine told me I should put an logo on it and send it to MTV. So I mailed a VHS of it to "MTV Networks" the address I got from the phone book. About two weeks later I got a call from a guy named Abbey, who said that they wanted to buy it. I remember the day he called, because it was the same day that I got my rejection letter from Cal Arts. I re-animated the same thing, a bit tighter. The spot won a BDA award (Broadcast Design Association) and a Jury Prize at the 1995 Holland Animation Festival. After I finished the ID, MTV offered me a job on Beavis and Butthead, which was my first ever studio job, and which brought me to New York City.

His directorial debut was for the Emmy-nominated series Down-Town, continuing on to direct the popular animated series Daria. Since then he has directed a handful of short films which earned him much reputation at film festivals worldwide as well as numerous awards. Smith and his studio produced the animated series "Blank on Blank" for PBS Digital Studios  an innovative animated show that visually illustrates rare audio interviews of famous artists, actors and musicians.

Filmography 
 Oblivious (1994) Director/Animator
 MTV Swallow-Face (1995) Director/Animator
 MTV Beavis and Butthead Do America (1996) Animator 
 Life Animator (1999, collaborative)
 Drink (2001) Director/Animator
 Delivery (2003) Director/Animator
 Moving Along (2004) Director/Animator
 Handshake (2004) Director/Animator
 Puppet (2006) Director/Animator
 Masks (2010) Director/Animator
 Pittari (2017) Director/Animator
 Punch Everyone (2017) Director/Animator
 Body of Water (2017) Director/Animator
 Pour 585 (2018) Director/Animator

Awards and honors 
 2018 Academy of Motion Picture Arts and Sciences(AMPAS) Member
 Best Animation Comicpalooza Film Festival 2018
 Best Animation NYC Downtown Short Film Festival 2018
 Best Story Animation Studio Festival 2018
 Best Animated Short, Woodstock Film Festival 2017
 Best Experimental Short, Santa Cruz Film Festival 2017
 Best Animated Short, Bend Film Festival 2017
 Best Animated Short, Raleigh Film Festival 2017  
 Honorable Mention, Asia South East Short Film Festival 2017
 2017 Spencer Barnett Memorial Fund Visiting Artist, Sarah Lawrence College. 
 American Filmatic Arts Award 2017
 Audience Award, 2017 ASIFA-San Francisco Film Festival
 2nd Place Independent, 2017 ASIFA-East
 Best Sound, 2017 ASIFA-East
 Audience Award 2017 ASIFA-San Francisco.
 Emmy Nomination, Wynton Marsalis, Outstanding New Approaches.
 Streamy Nomination, Best Animation.
 Best Animation, Santa Clarita Valley Film Festival.
 Jury Award, Durango Film Festival.   
 Jury Award, Anima Mundi, Brazil.
 Surreal Animation Award, Dragon Con Film Fest, Presented by Ralph Bakshi.
 Excellence in Animation, ASIFA-East.
 Best Animation, Naperville Independent Film Festival.
 Best Animation, Wild Rose Independent Film Festival.
 Best Animation, Back Seat Independent Film Festival.
 Best Animation, Arizona Underground Film Festival.
 Best Animation, Dragon Con Film Festival.
 Best Animation, Great Lakes Film Festival.
 Best Animation, Phoenix Film Festival.
 Best Animation, First Sundays Film Festival, New York City.
 Honorable Mention, Smogdance Film Festival.
 Second Place, ASIFA-East (Assoc. Internationale du Film d'Animation).
 3rd Place, Lake Havasu Film Festival.
 1st Place, Dragon Con Film Festival, Atlanta.
 Best Music Video, No Exit Music Video Festival.
 Best Animation, Northampton Independent Film Festival.
 Best Animation, Action on Film Festival, Los Angeles.
 Best Animation, Griffin International Film Festival.
 Honorable Mention, Signals International Film Festival, UK.
 Best Animation, Grand Festival Award, Berkeley Film Festival.
 Best Animation, Garden State Film Festival.
 Best Animation, Myrtle Beach Film Festival.
 3rd Place, First Glance Film Festival, Los Angeles.
 Second Place, Asheville Film Festival.
 Honorable Mention, Smogdance International Film Festival.
 Best Animation, Temecula Valley International Film Festival.
 Best Animation, Myrtle Beach Film Festival.
 Best Animation, Golden Film Festival.
 Best Animation, Spindletop Film Festival.
 Best Animation, Long Island Film Expo.
 Bronze Award, Kalamazoo Animation Festival.
 Best Animation, Black Point Film Festival.
 Best Music Video, Oxford Film Festival.
 Jury Award, Savannah Film Festival. Presented by Producer Don Bluth.
 1st Place, ASIFA-East (Association Internationale du Film d'Animation).
 Pulcinella Award Nomination, Cartoons on the Bay, Italy.
 Honorable Mention, Tribeca Underground Film Festival.
 Honorable Mention, ASIFA San Fran.
 Best Animation, Northampton Film Festival.
 Jury Prize, China International Cartoon Animation Festival.
 Best Music Video, Urban Mediamakers Film Festival.
 Winner, IMVF, International Music Video Festival.
 Winner, Sponsored Films, ASIFA-East Animation Festival.
 1st Place, ASIFA-East(Association Internationale du Film d'Animation).
 Winner, "The One to Watch" Award, Chicago Animation Festival.
 Gold Pencil Award, The One Club.
 DTC National Communication Bronze Award.
 2nd Place, ASIFA-San Francisco Animation Festival.
 2nd Place, ASIFA-East(Association Internationale du Film d'Animation).
 Best Debut Film, New York Film Expo.
 Jury Award, Holland Animation Festival.
 Fellowship Grant. New York Foundation for the Arts.
 Bronze Award. BDA(Broadcast Design Assoc.)
 Fellowship Grant. Cable Endowment of Springfield Public Service Grant.

References 

 Oscars.org Academy of Motion Picture Arts and Sciences New Members 2018
 Literal Magazine Patrick Smith Behind the Scenes
 Chicago Tribune New Cartoon Series Addresses Addiction
 Studio360 WNYC Interview With Patrick Smith
 Animation World Interview With Patrick Smith
 TheFlux.tv podcast interview With Patrick Smith
 DVD "Liquid Tales: The Animated Films of Patrick Smith"
 Cartoon Brew: Pat Smith Blank on Blank

External links
 PBS Blank on Blank Animated Series

 Patrick Smith's Homepage.
 Official blog "Scribble Junkies" in partnership with artist/animator Bill Plympton

1972 births
Living people
American animators
American animated film directors
Animation educators
Sarah Lawrence College faculty